Thomas Rohregger (born 23 December 1982) is an Austrian former professional road bicycle racer, who competed as a professional between 2005 and 2013.

Rohregger retired at the end of the 2013 season, after nine years as a professional.

In retirement, Rohregger was involved in the course design for the 2018 UCI Road World Championships around Innsbruck.

Major results

2006
1st Mountains classification Tour de Luxembourg (2.HC)
2nd National Time Trial Championships
4th National Road Race Championships
4th Overall Tour of Austria (2.HC)
1st Mountains classification
2007
 2nd Overall Tour of Austria (2.HC)
1st Stage 3
 3rd National Road Race Championships
 4th Overall Giro del Trentino (2.1)
 6th Rund um den Henninger (1.HC)
2008
 1st Overall Tour of Austria
 7th Overall Tour du Luxembourg
2010
 1st Mountains classification Tour Down Under
2011
 4th Overall Tour of Austria
 1st Stage 1 (TTT) Vuelta a España
2012
 7th Overall Tour of Austria

References

External links

Palmares on Trap Friis
Palmares on Cycling Base (French)

Austrian male cyclists
Cyclists at the 2008 Summer Olympics
Olympic cyclists of Austria
1982 births
Living people
Sportspeople from Innsbruck
Austrian Vuelta a España stage winners
21st-century Austrian people